Dreahook is an unincorporated community in Readington Township in Hunterdon County, New Jersey, United States at the intersection of CR-620/Dreahook Rd and CR 523.  The name is a corruption of Driehoek (drie-three and hoek-corner, as in corners of a triangle), which is the Dutch word for triangle. It was likely named for the triangle created by the settlement in its relation to the early roads to Flemington, Whitehouse Station, Readington Village and Pleasant Run, which have since been rerouted. Dreahook Creek and Holland Brook both pass through the area of the former village.  Dreahook village once had blacksmith shop, a school and a store.  Settlers farmed the land here because of the rich soil along the base of Cushetunk Mountain. There are still numerous farms in the area, including the Readington River Buffalo Farm between Dreahook and Stanton.

References

Unincorporated communities in Readington Township, New Jersey
Unincorporated communities in Hunterdon County, New Jersey
Unincorporated communities in New Jersey